The 2nd Belorussian Front  (Russian: Второй Белорусский фронт, alternative spellings are  2nd Byelorussian Front) was a military formation, of Army group size, of the Soviet Army during the Second World War. Soviet army groups were known as Fronts.

The 2nd Belorussian Front was created in February 1944 as the Soviets pushed the Germans back towards Byelorussia. General Colonel Pavel Kurochkin became its first commander. In hiatus in April 1944, its headquarters was reformed from the army headquarters of the disbanding 10th Army.

Operations 

On 2 January 1944 2BF entered the former Polish territories.

On 26 June 1944 the Front's forces captured Mogilev in the Mogilev Offensive. On 4 July, 2BF was tasked with mopping up the remains of Army Group Centre's Fourth Army under the command of General von Tippelskirch and the remains of the Ninth Army in a large pocket southeast of Minsk. On 9 July The 2BF attacks northwest from Vitebsk as part of a major Soviet offensive east of Riga towards Rezekne in order to cut off the German Army Group North. On 29 July Soviets reach the coast cutting Army Group North off in Estonia and Eastern Latvia. On 13 September 2BF captured Łomża, west of Białystok. In November 1944 Marshal Konstantin Rokossovsky was appointed commander of 2BF just in time for its last two great offensives of World War II. As part of a massive attack by four Fronts on 14 January 1945 2BF attacked East Prussia (East Prussian Offensive) and later Pomerania (East Pomeranian Offensive).
27 July 1944 Liberation of Bialystok
 10 January 2BF attacked towards Neustettin but was halted by German counterattacks.
 14 January 2BF attacks East Prussia (East Prussian Offensive).
 24 January 1st and 2nd Belorussian Fronts attack in Pomerania (East Pomeranian Offensive). German Second Army cut off.
 27 February Elements of the 2BF enter Pomerania
 28 February 2BF captured Neustettin.
 5 March The fortress city of Graudenz on the Vistula surrenders to troops of the 2BF
 10 March 2BF captures Zoppot
 13 March 2BF launches an offensive against the Braunsberg pocket south of Königsberg
 18 March 1st Polish Army of the 2BF captured the fortress city of Kolberg
 23 March 2BF attacked the German II Army in the Danzig area.
 30 March Soviet troops finally capture Danzig,
 20 April 2BF offensive across the lower Oder towards Neubrandenburg, Stralsund and Rostock.
 25 April 2BF, seized a large bridgehead on the Oder River south of Stettin forcing the centre of the III Panzer Army back to Prenzlau.
 26 April 2BF takes Stettin.
 27 April 2BF captures Prenzlau and Angermünde 70 km (44 mi) northwest of Berlin
 5 May elements of the 2BF entered Peenemünde.

On 9 April 1945 Königsberg in East Prussia finally fell to the Red Army. This freed up 2BF to move west to the east bank of the Oder river.  During the first two weeks of April the Soviets performed their fastest Front redeployment of the war. General Georgy Zhukov concentrated his 1st Belorussian Front (1BF) which had been deployed along the Oder river from Frankfurt in the south to the Baltic, into an area in front of the Seelow Heights. The 2BF moved into the positions being vacated by the 1BF north of the Seelow Heights. While this redeployment was in progress gaps were left in the lines and the remnants of the German II Army which had been bottled up in a pocket near Danzig managed to escape across the Oder.

In the early hours on 16 April the final offensive of the war to capture Berlin and link up with Western Allied forces on the Elbe started with attacks by 1BF and To the south General Konev's 1st Ukrainian Front (1UF).  On 20 April the 2BF join in the attack. By 25 April 2BF broke out of its bridge head south of Stettin and had by the end of the war captured all of Germany north of Berlin as far west as the front lines of the British 21 Army Group which had advanced over the river Elbe in some places.

Atrocities 
In Demmin on and around 1 May 1945 members of the 65th Army of 2nd Belorussian Front first broke into a distillery and then rampaged through the town, committing mass rapes, arbitrarily executing civilians, and setting fire to buildings. Many Demmin civilians committed suicide.

Post-war 
The Headquarters of the 2nd Byelorussian Front become the Headquarters of the Northern Group of Forces (NGF), the Soviet occupation force in Poland, effective on 10 June 1945. Most of the NGF's forces were drawn from 2nd Belorussian Front, along with some elements of the 1st Byelorussian and 1st Ukrainian Fronts.

Component Armies 
The Armies that were part of the 2nd Belorussian Front included:
 2nd Shock Army
 19th Army
 49th Army
 50th Army
 65th Army
 70th Army
 5th Guards Tank Army
 4th Air Army

Notes

References
Antill, P., Battle for Berlin: April – May 1945, http://www.historyofwar.org/articles/battles_berlin.html

Belorussian 2
Military units and formations established in 1944
Military units and formations disestablished in 1945